Ana Sofia Galindo (born February 8, 1987) is a Honduran swimmer, who specialized in backstroke events. As part of her preparations in international tournaments, she is a member of Bantral Aquatic Club, and is coached and trained by Carlos Menéndez.

Galindo qualified for the women's 100 m backstroke at the 2004 Summer Olympics in Athens, by receiving a Universality place from FINA, in an entry time of 1:12.30. She participated in heat one against two other swimmers Lenient Obia of Nigeria, and Yelena Rojkova of Turkmenistan. Galindo posted a lifetime best of 1:11.80 to take a second spot behind Obia by a 1.85-second margin. Galindo failed to advance into the semifinals, as she placed fortieth overall in the preliminaries.

References

External links
Sports Profile – Terra Central America 

1987 births
Living people
Honduran female swimmers
Olympic swimmers of Honduras
Swimmers at the 2004 Summer Olympics
Female backstroke swimmers
Sportspeople from Tegucigalpa
20th-century Honduran women
21st-century Honduran women